The following is a list of Major League Baseball players, retired or active.

Sh through So

References

External links
Last Names starting with S – Baseball-Reference.com

 Sf